Lone Oak is an unincorporated community in McCracken County, Kentucky, United States. The population was 454 at the 2000 census, at which time it was a city. It is a part of the Paducah, KY-IL Micropolitan Statistical Area.

History
The area was named Pepper's Mill in 1875 after Dr. W.T. Pepper, an early resident of the area, who constructed a gristmill near the intersection of Lovelaceville road and US Highway 45. After "Pepper's Mill" was declined as a post office name in 1900, the name "Lone Oak" was chosen due to the large oak tree that stood at the intersection of Lovelaceville road and US Highway 45. The tree was cut down for a Christmas bonfire in 1903. A historical marker now sits on the site where the tree once stood.
 
On November 4 2008, the citizens of Lone Oak voted 75–64 to dissolve the city. The area is still referred to as the community of Lone Oak, but all government jobs, including the mayor, city council, and police, were eliminated when the city was dissolved. The measure went into effect 30 days after the date of the vote.

Geography
Lone Oak is located at  (37.036165, -88.666131).

Demographics
As of the census of 2000, there were 454 people, 220 households, and 128 families residing in the city. The racial makeup of the city was 93.83% White, 1.76% African American, 0.22% Asian, 2.64% from other races, and 1.54% from two or more races. Hispanics or Latinos of any race were 4.19% of the population.

There were 220 households, out of which 22.3% had children under the age of 18 living with them, 41.4% were married couples living together, 10.5% had a female householder with no husband present, and 41.8% were non-families. 38.2% of all households were made up of individuals, and 17.3% had someone living alone who was 65 years of age or older. The average household size was 2.06 and the average family size was 2.68.

The age distribution was 17.4% under the age of 18, 12.1% from 18 to 24, 31.1% from 25 to 44, 20.3% from 45 to 64, and 19.2% who were 65 years of age or older. The median age was 40 years. For every 100 females, there were 84.6 males. For every 100 females age 18 and over, there were 81.2 males.

The median income for a household in the city was $31,250, and the median income for a family was $35,938. Males had a median income of $30,417 versus $19,833 for females. The per capita income for the city was $17,512. About 10.6% of families and 15.3% of the population were below the poverty line, including 20.4% of those under age 18 and 11.1% of those age 65 or over.

References

Former municipalities in Kentucky
Unincorporated communities in McCracken County, Kentucky
Populated places established in 1979
Populated places disestablished in 2008
Paducah micropolitan area
Unincorporated communities in Kentucky